KNRB (100.1 FM) is a radio station broadcasting a Christian format. Licensed to Atlanta, Texas, United States, it serves the Texarkana area. The station is owned by Family Worship Center Church, Inc.

External links
http://sonlifetv.com

NRB
Radio stations established in 1978
1978 establishments in Texas